Qingliu is a county of western Fujian province, People's Republic of China. It is under the administration of Sanming City.

Administration
The county executive, legislature, and judiciary are in Longjin Town, along with the CPC and PSB branches.

Other Towns (镇, zhen)
Songxi
Songkou
Changjiao
Lingdi

Township (乡, xiang)
Donghua
Linshe
Wenjiao
Sheming
Tianyuan
Litian
Shawu
Laifang
Dengjia
Lijia

Climate

References

County-level divisions of Fujian
Sanming